John Yaxley (died c. 1625) was an English lawyer and politician who sat in the House of Commons as Member of Parliament for Cambridge between 1597 and 1611.

Career
Yaxley probably entered Gray's Inn in 1573. He became an attorney in Cambridge and acquired an estate at Waterbeach, 6 miles (9.7 km) to the north.

By 1597, Yaxley was an alderman of Cambridge, and in the same year he was elected Member of Parliament for the city. He was Mayor of Cambridge in 1599–1600. He was re-elected as MP for Cambridge in 1601 and again in 1604. While an MP, Yaxley was appointed to various committees in the House.

Lands
By 1610, Yaxley was steward of the manor of Waterbeach-cum-Denny. in 1614 he and Edward Aungier of Cambridge purchased the manors of Waterbeach and Causeway from the Crown for £900.

Will
Yaxley made his will on 20 September 1624, and died between that date and 22 November 1626, when the will was disputed.

References

Year of birth missing
Year of death missing
English MPs 1597–1598
People from Cambridge
English lawyers
English MPs 1601
English MPs 1604–1611
16th-century English lawyers
People from Waterbeach